Isabel Zedlacher (born 12 December 1977) is an Austrian snowboarder. She was born in Villach. She competed at the 1998 Winter Olympics, in giant slalom.

References

External links 
 

1977 births
Living people
People from Villach
Austrian female snowboarders
Olympic snowboarders of Austria
Snowboarders at the 1998 Winter Olympics
Sportspeople from Carinthia (state)